Ann Jones (or similar) may refer to:

Writers 
Ann Jones (author) (born 1937), American writer on women's issues
Anne Jones (writer) (born 1955), Australian editor and administrator
Anna Jones (food writer), columnist and cookbook author
Catherine Jones (novelist) (born 1956), who previously used the pen name Annie Jones

Film and television personalities
Anna Jones (journalist) (born 1966), English business journalist and news presenter
Anna Wilson-Jones (born 1970), English actress, primarily on television
Annie Jones (actor) (born 1967), Australian actress

Others 
Ann Jones (diver) (born 1949), Australian diver
Ann Jones (politician) (born 1953), represents Vale of Clwyd in National Assembly of Wales
Ann Jones (tennis) (born 1938), English table tennis and lawn tennis champion
Anna Elinor Jones (1842–1865), American Civil War spy
Anna H. Jones (1855–1932), Canadian-born American clubwoman, suffragist, and educator
Anna Jones (businesswoman) (born 1975), British businessperson and entrepreneur
Anne Griffith-Jones (1891–1973), Welsh educator in Malaysia and Singapore
Annie Jones (bearded woman) (1865–1902), American circus attraction
Annie Liao Jones (fl. 2009–2013), founder of Rock Candy Media
Anne P. Jones (born 1935), American attorney
Anna Russell Jones (1902–?), African American artist

Fictional characters
Anna Jones (Indiana Jones character), the mother of Young Indiana Jones, starting in 1992
Annie Jones, Ruth Gordon's mother in the 1953 film The Actress

See also 
Ann Jonas (1932–2013), American children's writer and illustrator

Jones (surname), including a list of people with the name